Thomas Pheasant (born 1955), is an American interior designer who owns a design company in Washington D.C and has collaboration with Baker and McGuire furniture.

Early life 
Thomas Pheasant was born in Washington D.C. in 1955 and grew up in a split level house in Adelphi.

Pheasant demonstrated an interest in interior design by redesigning his own bedroom at the age of 9 after being inspired by an Auntie Mame episode in which she redecorated her apartment. His design changes included dying his bedspread, adding decorations and even changing his furniture.

Pheasant went to college at the University of Maryland where he started studying architecture. In his second year he started to look at interior design after a one-on-one presentation with a professor who told him he had a connection with interior spaces.

While in college, Pheasant volunteered at a fabric showroom. He thought this would be a good way to meet designers and be able to network with them. Six months into working there Pheasant overheard designer Victor Shargai telling the manager he was looking for an assistant and if he knew anyone that would be interested. Pheasant set up a meeting with him and put together a port folio filled with fake projects. He got the job and worked in the back room folding clothes and returning items to the showroom. After four years, he was approached about a project and as he was unable to take any side jobs with his assistant position decided to quit and take the project. Due to Pheasant's youth and inexperience he was fired by his first client as he didn't fully understand what they wanted.

His career began after college in the early 1970s when he bought a derelict house. After his renovation was complete the local paper picked up on it and hailed him as "Washington's new, young, "radically spare" designer".

Career 
Pheasant opened his own company based in Washington D.C in 2013 named Thomas Pheasant studios which is collection of limited edition furniture. The studio acts to "be an actively moving force that is inspired as much by history and nature as it is by the unique talents of the artisans and craftsmen". The first collection he launched in 2013 focused on decomposition looking at nature. He has worked on many residential and commercial projects throughout the United States, Europe and Asia. He has worked on the Hay-Adams Hotel and with BET co-founder Sheila Johnson. One of his most notable works was decorating and designing The Blair House, which is the active guest house in the White House. Pheasant was hired in 2012 by the Blair House Restoration Fund to refresh the Blair House after it suffering from wear and tear.

Pheasant was named "Dean of American Design" by Architectural Digest US in 2005 and Andrew Martin International Designer of the Year. He was also the first American designer to exhibit at the Pavillon des Antiquaries et des Beaux Arts in Paris.

Pheasant is currently working on Georgetown's Rosewood Hotel where he will be designing the interiors of “The six new, 1,000-square-foot townhouses”.

Collections

Baker 
Baker is a luxury furniture brand with which Pheasant launched a collection in 2002. The collection was titled The Thomas Pheasant Collection and was made up of furniture described by Sheffield Furniture as using "simplicity, bold silhouettes and clean finishes". The collection exhibits strong neoclassical influences and demonstrates an idea which Pheasant refers to as "bridging the past to the present".

Exceptional Living describes his Baker Furniture collection as “modern, elegant and distinctive” and that he is able to “evoke a feeling of calm, luxurious comfort.”

McGuire 
Pheasant made two separate collections with McGuire, The Thomas Pheasant Collection and The Thomas Pheasant Outdoor Collection. The Thomas Pheasant Collection focuses on indoor furniture which uses McGuire's signature materials "rattan core, leather, cast bronze, glass and stone" mixed with Pheasant's design style. The Thomas Pheasant Outdoor Collection focuses on outdoor environments consisting of functional and versatile pieces.

Book 
In 2013, Pheasant wrote a book with Victoria Sant titled Simply Serene published by Rizzoli International Publications.

Style 
Pheasant's design style is a combination of the past and present described by Barker as a "contemporary dimension to classical design". His style is inspired by various different traditional architecture from all around the world.

His design philosophy is said by Taste of Life Magazine to be composed of “classic minimalism, tradition, and vision ….. with a balanced tranquillity.”

Publications 
 Simply Serene by Thomas Pheasant (2013)
 Interior Design Master Class (2016)
 Decorating with Carpets: The Stark Tradition (2015)
 Jonas: The Art of Fine Upholstery (2015)
 Robert A.M. Stern, Buildings & Projects 2004-2009 (2009)
 Regency Redux (2008)
 House Beautiful Colors for your Home (2008)
 Spectacular Homes of Greater Washington (2006)
 American Designers' Houses (2004)
 Eclectic Style in Interior Design (1998)
 Showcase of Interior Design (1997)
 Mirror by Design: Using Reflection to Transform (1996)

References 

Living people
1955 births
People from Washington, D.C.
American interior designers
American company founders
American furniture designers
American non-fiction writers